Alain Muana Kizamba (born November 10, 1980), is a goalkeeper from the Democratic Republic of the Congo. He played in DC Motema Pembe and has played for DR Congo national team. In 2006, he was transferred from DC Motema Pembe to Sport Luanda e Benfica.

Kizamba helped Benfica reach the final of the 2007 Angolan Cup.

References

External links

Living people
Democratic Republic of the Congo footballers
Association football goalkeepers
Expatriate footballers in Angola
Democratic Republic of the Congo expatriates in Angola
C.D. Primeiro de Agosto players
Daring Club Motema Pembe players
S.L. Benfica (Luanda) players
1980 births
Democratic Republic of the Congo international footballers
21st-century Democratic Republic of the Congo people